Peter Stephen Benneyworth (1938-1974), was a male boxer who competed for England.

Boxing career
He represented England in the -54 Kg division at the 1958 British Empire and Commonwealth Games in Cardiff, Wales.

He fought out of the Caius Boxing Club.

References

1938 births
1974 deaths
English male boxers
Boxers at the 1958 British Empire and Commonwealth Games
Commonwealth Games medallists in boxing
Commonwealth Games bronze medallists for England
Bantamweight boxers
Medallists at the 1962 British Empire and Commonwealth Games